Toltec is an unincorporated community in Albany County, Wyoming, United States.

References

Unincorporated communities in Albany County, Wyoming
Unincorporated communities in Wyoming